Creston is a census-designated place in San Luis Obispo County, California, about 10 miles east of Atascadero.

History
Creston (named after Calvin J. Cressy) was founded in 1884 on the Rancho Huerhuero Mexican land grant.

Creston was home to Creston Farm, where a number of retired American thoroughbred racehorses were boarded, including those listed below.

Notable retired racehorses who were stabled there include:

 Flying Paster (1976–1992)
 Golden Act (1976–2000)
 Skywalker (1982–2003)
 Itsallgreektome (1987–2007)

Writer and Scientology founder L. Ron Hubbard died at his ranch near Creston.

In 2014, Creston was made an American Viticultural Area called the Creston District AVA.

Transportation
Creston is near the following highways:
 California State Route 58
 California State Route 46
 California State Route 41
 California State Route 229

Demographics

The 2010 United States Census reported that Creston had a population of 94. The racial makeup of Creston was 89 (94.7%) White, 0 (0.0%) African American, 2 (2.1%) Native American, 1 (1.1%) Asian, 0 (0.0%) Pacific Islander, 0 (0.0%) from other races, and 2 (2.1%) from two or more races. Hispanic or Latino of any race were 6 persons (6.4%).

The Census reported that 94 people (100% of the population) lived in households, 0 (0%) lived in non-institutionalized group quarters, and 0 (0%) were institutionalized.

There were 36 households, out of which 15 (41.7%) had children under the age of 18 living in them, 20 (55.6%) were opposite-sex married couples living together, 3 (8.3%) had a female householder with no husband present, 3 (8.3%) had a male householder with no wife present.  There were 3 (8.3%) unmarried opposite-sex partnerships, and 1 (2.8%) same-sex married couples or partnerships. 8 households (22.2%) were made up of individuals, and 2 (5.6%) had someone living alone who was 65 years of age or older. The average household size was 2.61.  There were 26 families (72.2% of all households); the average family size was 2.96.

The population was spread out, with 22 people (23.4%) under the age of 18, 4 people (4.3%) aged 18 to 24, 28 people (29.8%) aged 25 to 44, 27 people (28.7%) aged 45 to 64, and 13 people (13.8%) who were 65 years of age or older.  The median age was 39.0 years. For every 100 females, there were 80.8 males.  For every 100 females age 18 and over, there were 80.0 males.

The homeowner vacancy rate was 0%; the rental vacancy rate was 0%.  64 people (68.1% of the population) lived in owner-occupied housing units and 30 people (31.9%) lived in rental housing units.

References

External links
 History of Creston, in Creston News, a website

Census-designated places in San Luis Obispo County, California
Populated places established in 1884
1884 establishments in California
Census-designated places in California